Lotus Pond is a small water body Inside MLA Colony, Jubilee Hills, Hyderabad, India. The pond is surrounded by lush green flora and a 1.2 kilometer path.

Lotus Pond is home to more than 20 species of birds. A few of them are pied kingfisher, white wagtail, common moorhen, little grebe, sunbirds, common coot, and little egret.

The pond is maintained by the Greater Hyderabad Municipal Corporation (GHMC).

The Lotus Pond was conceived to be an eco-conservation project bringing natural elements into the concept of the project without disturbing the ecosystem and conserving the natural rocks and pond.

The launch of the construction of the project was on 20 November 1999. The work was completed in late 2001.

External links

Google Maps view

Geography of Hyderabad, India